The 1931 Fordham Rams football team was an American football team that represented Fordham University as an independent during the 1931 college football season. In its fifth year under head coach Frank Cavanaugh, Fordham compiled a 6–1–2 record, shut out five of nine opponents, and outscored all opponents by a total of 205 to 36.

Schedule

References

Fordham
Fordham Rams football seasons
Fordham Rams football